Cordell Jackson (July 15, 1923 – October 14, 2004) was an American guitarist thought to be the first woman to produce, engineer, arrange and promote music on her own rock and roll music label.

Early life
She was born Cordell Miller in Pontotoc, Mississippi, where her father led a string band, the Pontotoc Ridge Runners.  As a child she learned guitar, piano, and double bass, and soon began performing in her father's band and on radio in Tupelo.  She married William Jackson in 1943, and settled in Memphis, Tennessee, where she joined the Fisher Air Craft Band and wrote songs.  After installing recording equipment in her home, she recorded demo records for Sam Phillips before he set up Sun Records.

Career
Jackson founded the Moon Records label in Memphis in 1956.  Unable to break into the Sun label's stable of male artists, she received the advice and assistance of RCA Records' Chet Atkins in forming this new label to release her music. She began releasing and promoting on the label singles she recorded in her home studio, serving as engineer, producer and arranger. The artists recorded included her and a small family of early rock and roll, rockabilly, and country music performers she recruited from several Southern states.

Tav Falco's Panther Burns and Alex Chilton helped create new interest in her career in the 1980s when they began covering some of her Moon label's old singles such as "Dateless Night", a song she originally wrote in the 1950s for Florida artist Allen Page. Jackson then began playing occasional shows in the 1980s with her signature red Hagstrom electric guitar as a solo artist in Memphis, Hoboken, New York, and Chicago nightclubs. She recorded new material on her label with Memphis musicians Colonel Robert Morris and Bob Holden, becoming known as a "rock-and-roll granny" solo guitar instrumentalist. She appeared in 1991 and 1992 on national talk shows like Late Night with David Letterman and in a television commercial duelling with rockabilly artist Brian Setzer on guitar.

In the late 1990s, Cordell co-wrote and played with the Rockabilly icon, Colonel Robert Morris in Memphis. Colonel Robert also helped edit the book based on her life and career.

Her Moon Records label was the oldest continuously operating label in Memphis at the time of her death in 2004. The 50s Rock on the Moon of Memphis, Tennessee + an Oddity, a compilation album of the label's 1950s singles, was released on vinyl in the early 1980s and was later sold on compact disc until her death in 2004. The original 1950s vinyl singles compiled on that album have been displayed at the Rock and Roll Hall of Fame in Cleveland, Ohio. She also released video singles through her label in the 1990s, including "Football Widow" and filmmaker Dan Rose's production of "The Split." Her marketing of her own video singles, as opposed to marketing them in multiple-song video collections, is reputed to be another first in her innovative lifetime of doing things her own way, bucking the trends of standard industry practice.

Jackson's only solo full-length album to date, Cordell Jackson — Live in Chicago was released on Bughouse Records in 1997. Information and memorabilia about Jackson is included in the Memphis Rock N' Soul Museum in Memphis.

Death
She died in Memphis in 2004, aged 81.

Trivia
 Appeared in a Budweiser commercial where she interrupts Brian Setzer during his rehearsal, to teach him a fast lesson on how to play rock-and-roll guitar.
 Had a role as "Bathroom Lady" in the 1992 film The Gun in Betty Lou's Handbag.
 On January 23, 1995, Cordell Jackson sent a letter to then Moon Records requesting them to cease the use of the name Moon Records, thus prompting the New York-based ska label to add the "ska" portion to their current name Moon Ska Records.

Discography

Singles
Cordell Jackson
 "Rock And Roll Christmas" / "Beboppers' Christmas" - Moon Records G80W-6407/8 - (1956)<ref>Rockin''' Country Style Jackson, Cordell</ref>
Cordell Jackson and her Guitar
 "Football Widow" / "I'm at Home Again (In the Memories of My Mind)" Moon Records EP-311 - (1983)
 "Rockin' Rollin' Eyes" / "Memphis Drag" - Sympathy for the Record Industry SFTRI 50 - (1990)

EPs
Cordell Jackson
 The Split - Moon Records MR 333 - (1980s) 
  Knockin' Sixty - Moon EP-312 - (1983)
Various artist compilations
 Moon Records of Memphis, Tennessee - Moon - EP-1001 - (198?) 

Albums
Cordell Jackson
 Live in Chicago - Bughouse 3 - (1997) 
Various artists compilations
 The 50s Rock On The Moon of Memphis, Tennessee + an Oddity - Moon Records LP-MR 3010 - (1979)   (Moon compilation LP, rereleased later on CD, United States, 1981* Rock And Roll Christmas (Jan/Star Club compilation, Sweden, 1989)
 Rock On The Moon (Redita compilation, the Netherlands)
 Living in a State of Love. (Memphis Music Community, 1990s)
 Rockabilly Xmas. (Buffalo Bop compilation, Germany, 2000)
  Past, Present and Future. (Inside Sounds, 2003)

Song sample
 Moon Discography Containing mp3 of Jackson's 1956 Moon Single "Rock and Roll Christmas"
 Johnny Tate: "Bop With Me Baby" / "Keeping Your Memories" / "Kind And Gentle '57"  Cleveland Rock-n-Roll Hall Of Fame

References for article
 Cline, Cheryl. "Cordell Jackson." Country Grrl. Accessed May 3, 2005.
 "'J' Artists & Songs." Rockabilly Hall of Fame website. Accessed May 3, 2005.
 Gordon, Terry (2004). "Cordell Jackson." Rockin' Country Style Artist Discography. Accessed May 3, 2005.
 Gordon, Terry (2004). "Moon." Rockin' Country Style Artist Discography. Accessed May 3, 2005.
 Hanas, Jim (August 4, 1997). "Cordell Jackson — Live in Chicago." Weekly Wire. Accessed May 3, 2005.
 Hoppula, Peter (1998–2005). "Moon Records Discography"; "Post-Productions of Moon Records/Cordell Jackson."  Wang Dang Dula! Accessed May 3, 2005.
 Porter, James and Austen, Jake (1993). "Cordell Jackson Interview." Rocktober #6. Accessed May 3, 2005.
 "Rockin' Grannie Cordell Jackson." Thrust Electronic''. Accessed May 3, 2005.

References

External links
 Roctober interview
 [ Allmusic]
 Country GRRL page
 Legends of the Memphis Music Scene Billboard article few Cordell Jackson
 Moon Records

1923 births
2004 deaths
People from Pontotoc, Mississippi
American rock guitarists
20th-century American guitarists
Women audio engineers
Guitarists from Mississippi
Record producers from Mississippi
American women record producers
Early Recording Engineers (1930-1959)
20th-century American women guitarists
21st-century American women